NEAC is a four-letter acronym that can stand for:

 New English Art Club, founded in London in 1885 as an alternate venue to the Royal Academy
 North Eastern Athletic Conference, former name of an NCAA Division III collegiate athletic conference now known as the United East Conference
 National Economic Action Council, a governing body created to solve economic crisis in Malaysia
 National Evangelical Anglican Congress, an occasional but highly influential congress for Evangelicals in the Church of England
 Network of European Active Citizens, is an international, non profit Organization whose aim is to stimulate a broader conscience in participation of people for the choices and strategies of developing a democratic culture.